Bazinet is a surname. Notable people with the surname include:

Bobby Bazinet, better known as Bobby Bazini (born 1989), French Canadian singer-songwriter 
Camille Leblanc-Bazinet (born 1988), Canadian professional CrossFit Games athlete
Charles Bazinet (1845–1916), Canadian politician and member in the Canadian House of Commons
Kevin Bazinet (born 1991), Canadian singer, winner of third season of the reality television series La Voix in 2015
Pierre "Baz" Bazinet (born 1956), Canadian record producer
René Bazinet (born 1955), German-Canadian clown, mime, and stage and film actor

See also
Lac-Bazinet, Quebec, an unorganized territory in the Laurentides region of Quebec, Canada